Novaya Mushta (Yañı Moşto) is a rural locality (a village) in Shushnursky Selsoviet, Krasnokamsky District, Bashkortostan, Russia. The population was 272 as of 2010. There are 5 streets.

Geography 
Novaya Mushta is located 38 km south of Nikolo-Beryozovka (the district's administrative centre) by road. Shushnur is the nearest rural locality.

References 

Rural localities in Krasnokamsky District